Pargais was a settlement and station (mutatio) of ancient Cilicia, on the road between Adana and Tarsus, inhabited during Byzantine times. 

Its site is located near Gökçeler in Asiatic Turkey.

References

Populated places in ancient Cilicia
Former populated places in Turkey
Populated places of the Byzantine Empire
History of Adana Province